Vez is a commune in the Oise department in northern France. As of 2019, it had a population of 273.

See also
Communes of the Oise department

References

External links
 Website about the castle "Donjon de Vez" 

Communes of Oise